are a type of Japanese rice cracker. They come in various shapes, sizes, and flavors, usually savory but sometimes sweet. Senbei are often eaten with green tea as a casual snack and offered to visiting house guests as a courtesy refreshment.

There are several types of traditional Japanese senbei. They can be baked or deep-fried and sometimes sweetened. Aside from rice, wheat flour or starch can be used. Some varieties even use foods other than grains, such as sakana senbei (fish-senbei), renkon senbei (lotus root senbei) and hone senbei (bone-senbei).

Senbei have several variations, including Nori-wrapped, Arare, Olive no Hana, Soy nut, and wet. Thin rice crackers (薄焼きせんべい usuyaki senbei) are popular in Australia and other countries.

In China, the same characters used to write senbei are read jiānbǐng; the term instead refers to a crepe and is more similar in preparation to okonomiyaki among Japanese foods. In Japan, senbei are hard and crispy, and are bite-sized snacks rather than street-food meals.

Preparation 

Senbei are made from glutinous rice which has been steamed for 15 to 20 minutes before being pounded into dough. After several days of refrigeration, the dough is cut into shapes.

Senbei are usually cooked by being baked or grilled, traditionally over charcoal. While being prepared they may be brushed with a flavoring sauce, often one made of soy sauce and mirin. They may then be wrapped with a layer of nori. Alternatively they may be flavored with salt or "salad" flavoring, among others.

History
Sweet senbei (甘味煎餅) came to Japan during the Tang dynasty, with the first recorded usage in 737 AD, and still are very similar to Tang traditional styles, originally often baked in the Kansai area, of which include the traditional "roof tile" senbei. These include ingredients like potato and wheat flour or glutinous rice, and are similar to castella cakes, distinctly different from what most people would consider as senbei today, though traditional senbei such as this can still be found, e.g. Iga meibutsu katayaki, in Iga City.

What Japanese commonly refer to as senbei nowadays were popularized by a teahouse in Sōka city in the Edo period, which spread salty soy sauce flavored senbei throughout Japan.

Modern senbei versions are very inventive and may include flavorings which can range from kimchi to wasabi to curry to chocolate.

Kansai senbei tend to use glutinous rice and are lightly seasoned and delicate in texture (saku saku). Kantō senbei were originally based on uruchimai, a non-glutinous rice, and they tend to be more crunchy (kari kari) and richly flavored.

Types 

 Age senbei (fried senbei)
 Atsuyaki senbei (thick senbei)
 Kometsubu senbei (grains of rice senbei)
 Nori senbei (seaweed senbei)
 Nure senbei (wet senbei)
 Satou senbei (sugar senbei)
 Salad senbei (salad flavored senbei)
 Usuyaki senbei (thin senbei)
 Zarame senbei (granulated suger senbei)

See also 
 Bakauke, a brand of senbei
 Sōka, Saitama, a famous senbei city

References 

Japanese snack food
Rice crackers
Wagashi
Beika
Japanese cuisine terms